Michel Deville (13 April 1931 – 16 February 2023) was a French film director and screenwriter.

Deville started his filmmaking career in the late 1950s, paralleling the emergence of the French New Wave directors. He never achieved the level of critical and international recognition of some of his contemporaries such as François Truffaut, Jean-Luc Godard and Claude Chabrol, possibly because of his more conventional filmmaking style. Nevertheless, his films, especially his comedies from the 1970s and 1980s, were popular in his native France. 

One of Deville's comedies, La Lectrice (The Reader) was probably his biggest success with international audiences. La Lectrice is about a woman (played by Miou-Miou), who finds work reading novels for the blind but gradually finds herself unwittingly attracting a clientele of fetishists who enjoyed being read to. At one time his films were difficult to find in North America but presently (2007) seven of his films are available in DVD in the U.S.

His 1980 film Le Voyage en douce was entered into the 30th Berlin International Film Festival. Five years later, his film Death in a French Garden was entered into the 35th Berlin International Film Festival.

A clip from his 1968 film Benjamin is included in Robert Bresson’s Une Femme Douce (1969).

Deville died on 16 February 2023, at the age of 91.

Filmography

References

External links
 

1931 births
2023 deaths
French film directors
French male screenwriters
French screenwriters
People from Boulogne-Billancourt
Best Director César Award winners